The Heart Is a Lonely Hunter (1940) is the debut novel by the American author Carson McCullers; she was 23 at the time of publication. It is about a deaf man named John Singer and the people he encounters in a 1930s mill town in the US state of Georgia.

A. S. Knowles, Jr., author of "Six Bronze Petals and Two Red: Carson McCullers in the Forties," wrote that the book "still seems to capture [the author's] total sensibility more completely than her other works." Frederic I. Carpenter wrote in The English Journal that the novel "essentially [...] described the struggle of all these lonely people to come to terms with their world, to become members of their society, to find human love—in short, to become mature."

Title 

The title comes from the poem "The Lonely Hunter" by the Scottish poet William Sharp, who used the pseudonym "Fiona MacLeod".
"Deep in the heart of Summer, sweet is life to me still, But my heart is a lonely hunter that hunts on a lonely hill."

Plot 

The book begins with a focus on the relationship between two close friends, John Singer and Spiros Antonapoulos, deaf-mutes who have lived together for several years. Antonapoulos becomes mentally ill, misbehaves, and, despite attempts at intervention from Singer, is eventually put into an insane asylum away from town. Now alone, Singer moves into a new room.

The remainder of the narrative centers on the struggles of four of John Singer's acquaintances: Mick Kelly, a tomboyish girl who loves music and dreams of buying a piano; Jake Blount, an alcoholic labor agitator; Biff Brannon, the observant owner of a diner; and Dr. Benedict Mady Copeland, an idealistic physician.

Creation and conception
McCullers sought to create a novel about a character to whom other characters reveal their innermost secrets. Initially her main character was Jewish.

Characters
The scholar Nancy B. Rich stated that many of the supporting characters are only concerned about their own causes and never achieve a "clear voice" due to their lack of courtesy to one another. Rich also stated that most of the characters do not stand a chance at making meaningful changes towards the governing system.

 John Singer
 Singer, a deaf engraver, has learned to oralise but chooses to only sign once he meets Antonapoulos. Various characters perceive Singer as being from or sympathetic to their respective demographic groups. Nancy B. Rich states that the character "neither confirms nor denies" these beliefs, making the question of whether they are true "moot". Rich also characterizes Singer as doing "almost nothing" in the story except benevolent acts that "suggest democracy at work". Rich added that Singer "appears prominent, but in reality[...]is little more than a memory or an expectation in the minds of other characters" and that the character has an "accessibility" that declines on part of the story. Hamilton stated that other characters perceive him as being sympathetic to their needs because of his mute status, and that the characters are wrong in perceiving him as a "god", and that Singer's thoughts centrally concern himself and his own needs.
 The majority of literary critics have perceived Singer as, in Rich's words, "the pivotal character of the novel", and Rich argues that the interaction of other characters with him is the reason for this. Rich described Singer as being there to "objectify the negative force of government". Rich stated that critics who did not perceive the political "parable" perceive Singer as a "God figure" with the remaining main cast being "of equal stature in a row behind him."
 Initially McCullers conceived him as a Jewish character named Harry Minowitz, based on a painting of a Jewish man in an art gallery whose expression she found to be, as described by Oliver Evans in The Georgia Review , "wise, kindly, and compassionate".
 Spiros Antonapoulos
 Spiros, the initial character depicted in the story, is a sweets manufacturer who is of Greek ancestry. Hamilton stated that before Antonapoulos's mental breakdown, he and Singer are not lonely even though the two had no other significant friendships. Carpenter wrote that Singer's and Antonapoulos's "devotion to each other recalls the desperate attachment of the two lonely ranch hands in Steinbeck's Of Mice and Men."
Rich stated that Spiros's status as a "deaf mute" "signals that his role[...]is associated with government" and serves as an "arm" of it. Rich wrote that Antonapoulos "has always remained just out of view of the major characters." Singer is the sole character to remind himself about Antonapoulos. Rich also stated that Antonapoulos symbolizes the Greek and Christian roots of the American political system. Hamilton stated that Singer overlooks the negative traits of Antonapoulos and thinks of positive ones, and so "offers his worship" to the latter.
 Margaret "Mick" Kelly
 Mick faces the effects of poverty which prevent her from achieving her dreams. According to Rich, the character "thinks of herself as an individualist" and has "delusions about her morality", and that she does "little thinking in general". According to Rich Mick "seems at first to be a nonconformist" while in fact Mick is shown to conform by the end of the story, adopting a feminine mode of dress while initially being a tomboy. Mick instills a sense of toughness in her brothers because she perceives the outside world as requiring strength from individuals. She also uses Singer as, in Carpenter's words, a "confidant". Rich stated that ultimately Mick "never matures" in terms of morals nor in terms of her intelligence. She becomes depressed after Singer's death.
 McCullers initially conceived Mick as a male character named Jester.
 Rich describes Mick as representing women and ordinary White Americans, particularly the silent majority. Most reviewers perceived her as the, according to McDonald, "central personage". Rich argues that "she represents the real causes of the failure of democracy" as while she has dreams she is unable to figure out what they are, and that she represents "public apathy". Rich stated that many reviewers perceive her problems as being external, "social and economic", as opposed to personal issues.
 Biff Brannon
 Hamilton states that Brannon has many qualities that could have allowed other characters to turn to him for support, or to make him their "god", and yet the characters instead do that to Singer. Rich states that the character represents "an average, middle class American" through his passion for democracy, gainful employment, and being "vaguely patriotic". Rich wrote that "Biff represents middle-class business interests". According to Rich, this makes him the sole character who has a chance of making meaningful changes in the governing system. Rich also stated that were critics wrongly perceiving him to be "a deviate" with some believing he is secretly attracted to men. Rich wrote that Biff fails to "understand" the issues facing other characters even though he "is sympathetic to the others". Hamilton wrote that Brannon has the widest "vision" of the five supporting characters and that he realizes that "order" is possible and that dilemmas may be solved. According to Hamilton, "For Biff, universal love is the answer to darkness."
 Rich believes that critics have not focused enough attention on him, arguing "he is the most important character in the parable".
 Dr. Benedict Mady Copeland
 Dr. Copeland is estranged from his family due to his focus on what Hamilton calls "his love to man", and Hamilton described him as "agnostic". Rich stated that "Dr. Copeland is only interested in the Negro problem" and that this limits his effectiveness in enacting societal change. Carpenter wrote that Singer treats Copeland "as his equal" and "shares [Copeland's] tortured protests against racial injustice." Copeland suffers a beating from prison guards when he tries to help his son, and moves to a poor farm as his tuberculosis is fatal.
 Jake Blount
 Hamilton stated that Jake is "drunk and abusive" and that "Singer thinks Jake is crazy." Rich argues that his lack of contact with Mick limits his effectiveness. Carpenter wrote that with Jake, Singer takes the role as "sympathetic "listener"".

Background
McCullers had started a politically oriented magazine and voiced a possibility of becoming active in politics.

Reception
When published in 1940, the novel created a literary sensation and enjoyed a rapid rise to the top of the bestseller lists; it was the first in a string of works by McCullers that give voice to those who are rejected, forgotten, mistreated or oppressed. Evans wrote that the initial reaction was "a divided reception from the critics, some of whom were inclined to view it, not so much as a novel in its own right, but as a kind of literary phenomenon—as the precocious product" of a young author who may turn out higher quality product when she is older.

Alice Hamilton wrote in the Dalhousie Review that the presence of so many mutes in the storyline "Taken literally [...] strains the bounds of credulity."

Frederic I. Carpenter wrote in The English Journal that the ending exhibits "frustration" as Biff Brannon makes comments and as Adolf Hitler makes proclamations over the radio.

The Modern Library ranked the novel seventeenth on its list of the 100 best English-language novels of the 20th century. Time included it in "TIME 100 Best English-language Novels from 1923 to 2005". In 2004 the novel was selected for Oprah's Book Club.

Adaptations

A film adaptation was made in 1968, starring Alan Arkin, Sondra Locke and Cicely Tyson.

A stage adaptation of The Heart Is a Lonely Hunter premiered on March 30, 2005, at the Alliance Theatre in Atlanta, Georgia. The show ran until April 24 of that year, then toured. The play was an Alliance Theater presentation done in association with The Acting Company out of New York. The play, adapted by Rebecca Gilman, was directed by Doug Hughes.

British artist Joe Simpson made McCullers's book the centerpiece of his 2014 painting, The Heart Is A Lonely Hunter. The painting shows two characters each reading the book on the London Underground; it is one of his ongoing series of paintings entitled, "London".

A radio dramatization was broadcast in two parts by BBC Radio 4 on 15 and 22 March 2020.

References

Notes

External links
 
 The Heart Is a Lonely Hunter first edition dustjacket, NYPL Digital Gallery

1940 American novels
American novels adapted into films
Disability in fiction
Houghton Mifflin books
Novels about racism
Novels by Carson McCullers
Novels set in Georgia (U.S. state)
Novels set in the 1930s
Southern Gothic novels
Fiction about suicide
1940 debut novels